The Jury of Nandi Awards announced Nandi Awards for the year 2010 on 5 August 2011 at Film Development Corporation.Radhakrishna directed  Vedam   won the best film award .  Nandamuri Balakrishna  has won Best actor Award for  Simha    and  Nithya Menon  has won the best actress award for her debut movie  Ala Modalaindi.

2010 Nandi Awards Winners List

See also
Nandi Awards of 2011

References

2010
2010 Indian film awards